Feedback-controlled electromigration (FCE) is an experimental technique to investigate the phenomenon known as electromigration. By controlling the voltage applied as the conductance varies it is possible to keep the voltage at a critical level for electromigration.

Theory
FCE has been shown to be reversible, demonstrating the fact that the electrons are moving rather than thermomigration or sublimation. The migration occurs due to the electronic wind force experienced by the metallic adatom. The electromigration occurs at a critical power dissipation  in the neck of the bridge. This leads to Electromigrated Nanogaps.

Uses
FCE is often used in forming nanogaps in metallic bridges.

Problems
Thermal runaway can occur when the neck is narrower than about 20 nm.

References and external links

Electronic design automation
Semiconductor device defects
Nanoelectronics
Emerging technologies